Ashok Dhanuka is an Indian film producer. He is the founder of Eskay Movies. One of the leading film production house, studio and distribution house in West Bengal. His son Himanshu Dhanuka is also a film producer and distributor.

Filmography
 Bhaijaan Elo Re (2018)
 Chalbaaz (2018)
 Nabab (2017)
 Begum Jaan (2017)
 Niyoti (2016)
 Shikari (2016) 
 Romeo vs Juliet (2015)
 Khiladi (2013)
 Kanamachi (2013)
 Khokababu (2012)
 Idiot (2012)
 Shotru (2011)
 Wanted (2010) (co-producer)
 Dujone (2009)
 Bhalobasa Bhalobasa (2008)

References

External links
 
 Ashok Dhanuka in Gomolo

Living people
Bengali film producers
Bengali Hindus
Indian Hindus
Year of birth missing (living people)
Indian film producers